Alick Athanaze (born 7 December 1998) is a Dominican cricketer. He made his List A debut for the West Indies Under-19s in the 2016–17 Regional Super50 on 25 January 2017.

In November 2017, he was named in the West Indies squad for the 2018 Under-19 Cricket World Cup. Following the West Indies' matches in the tournament, the International Cricket Council (ICC) named Athanaze as the rising star of the squad. He became the second batsman for the West Indies to score two centuries in one tournament, and finished as the competition's leading run-scorer, with 418 runs.

In June 2018, he was named in the Cricket West Indies B Team squad for the inaugural edition of the Global T20 Canada tournament.

He made his first-class debut for the Windward Islands in the 2018–19 Regional Four Day Competition on 6 December 2018. In October 2019, he was named in the Windward Islands' squad for the 2019–20 Regional Super50 tournament.

International career
In February 2023, Athanaze was selected in West Indies Test squad for the South Africa series.

References

External links
 

1998 births
Living people
Dominica cricketers
West Indies under-19 cricketers
Windward Islands cricketers
Place of birth missing (living people)